Drybrough & Co was a brewery in Edinburgh, Scotland, from 1895 to 1987. Members of the Drybrough family had been brewing beer in Edinburgh since before 1750. In 1892 they moved to a new factory at a greenfield site in Craigmillar, designed by Robert Hamilton-Paterson. It was the second brewery established in Craigmillar. The new company was established in 1895 and sold beer in south and west Scotland. They also supplied a brewery in Northumberland and one in Dundee. In 1965 they were taken over by Watney Mann, and in 1987 the company was bought by Allied Lyons, who closed the brewery. Production ended on 23 January 1987.

The brewery established the Drybrough Cup in 1971.

References

Breweries in Scotland
Defunct breweries of the United Kingdom
Companies based in Edinburgh
1895 establishments in Scotland
1987 disestablishments in Scotland
British companies established in 1895
British companies disestablished in 1987
Food and drink companies established in 1895
Food and drink companies disestablished in 1987